Made (stylized as MAdE) was a lo-fi pop band from Toronto, Ontario, Canada, active during the 1990s. Its members were Jason Taylor (lead vocals and guitar), Simon Bedford-James (guitar), Alison McLean (drums), and three different successive bass guitarists: John Bowker, later replaced by Scott Fairbrother, who was in turn replaced by Frank Guidoccio.

History
Made began performing at clubs in Toronto in 1994, and recorded two independent albums: Rumball and Big Brother. The first of these was released in late 1993 and cost about $300 to record. In 1995, they landed a deal with MCA Records. This resulted in MCA releasing their third album and major-label debut, Bedazzler, on January 28, 1997 in Canada. The album was re-released on January 29, 1997 on Universal Music Canada, and on May 20, 1997 on MCA in the United States. Writing for the Sun-Sentinel, Toni Birghenthal described the album as "fabulously put together and simply presented."

References

Musical groups from Toronto
MCA Records artists
Lo-fi music groups